Barroisiceras is an acanthoceratacean ammonite from the Upper Cretaceous, Coniacian, included in the family Collignoniceratidae.

Diagnosis
The shell of Barroisiceras is rather involute, coiled such that the outer whorl embraces much of the previous, and is generally compressed. Whorls are high with a strong crenulate keel and sparse umbilical tubercles that develop into pairs of commonly flat ribs.

Taxonomy
Barroisiceras is divided two subgenera, Barroisiceras (Barroisiceras) and Barroisiceras (Texasia),with Alstadenites sometimes added as a third, Barroisiceras (Alstadenites).
B. (Barroiciceras) is moderately involute and the suture is rather simple. B. (Texasia) is more evolute and has a distinctly eccentric umbilicus and more complex suture.

Distribution
Cretaceous of Austria, Czechoslovakia, France, Hungary, Italy, Japan, Morocco, Slovakia, Spain, Trinidad and Tobago and  USSR

References
Notes

Bibliography
 Arkell et al., 1957. Mesozoic Ammonoidea Treatise on Invertebrate Paleontology part L, Ammonoidea.

Ammonitida genera
Collignoniceratidae
Cretaceous ammonites
Ammonites of Europe
Coniacian life